Michaëlla Krajicek was the defending champion, but lost to Sachia Vickery in the second round.

Alison Van Uytvanck won the title, defeating Sofia Kenin in the final, 3–6, 7–6(7–4), 6–2.

Seeds

Main draw

Finals

Top half

Bottom half

References 
 Main draw

Red Rock Pro Open - Singles
2016 Red Rock Pro Open